Stourpaine & Durweston Halt was a station in the English county of Dorset. It was located between Shillingstone and Blandford Forum on the Somerset and Dorset Joint Railway. The station consisted of a small concrete platform and shelter.

History

The station was opened on 9 July 1928 by the Southern Railway.  It became part of the Southern Region of British Railways when the railways were nationalised in 1948. The halt was closed in 1956 as part of an economy campaign. Trains continued to pass the site until the S&DJR closed in 1966.

The site today 
The site is now hidden in trees off the A350 Blandford to Shaftesbury road, near the junction with the A357. Except for the simple shelter, most of the halt still survives, including the concrete posts and metal rail at the back edge of the platform

References

Further reading 

  
   ISBN(no ISBN)

External links
The Somerset & Dorset Joint Railway - Stourpaine
Photo of Station Nameboard
Station on navigable O.S. map

Disused railway stations in Dorset
Former Somerset and Dorset Joint Railway stations
Railway stations in Great Britain opened in 1928
Railway stations in Great Britain closed in 1956